Pyramid Ridge is a  mountain in Mendocino County, California.

Location

Pyramid Ridge is in Mendocino County, California, in the Mayacamas Mountains of the northern California Coast Ranges.
The Köppen climate classification is: Csb : Warm-summer Mediterranean climate.

Human activities

In November 2005 a program funded by the Joint Fire Services Program began on Pyramid Ridge to research fire treatments.
3 plots of standing trees were burned, trees on 3 plots were cut and burned, and trees on 3 plots were cut and left to rot.
The California Department of Forestry and Fire Protection  was responsible for all the burning.

Pyramid Ridge is only accessible by ATV or horseback.
It is known as a good area for deer hunting.
It is in the South Cow Mountain OHV Recreation Area, and is traversed by Trail 19 of the area.
As of 2016 informally developed trails led from the southeast, southwest and west segments of that trail, which were to be closed, barricaded and restored to a natural state to deter trespass on private property.

Notes

Sources

 

Mountains of Mendocino County, California